The García Rovira Province is  a province of the Colombian Department of Santander.

References 

Provinces of Santander Department